Francis William Sullivan, who wrote with the nom de plume Frank Williams, was an author. He wrote The Wilderness Trail a novel about the Hudson Bay area that was illustrated by Douglas Duer. It was made into the film The Wilderness Trail starring Tom Mix. The story was originally published in Photoplay Magazine as Glory Road and was followed by a sequel titled Star of the North.

Norval MacGregor directed the 1919 film version of Sullivan's 1914 novel Child of Banishment.

Sullivan's story The Godson of Jeanette Gontreau was adapted into the 1918 film The Flames of Chance directed by Raymond Wells and starring Margery Wilson.

Bibliography
The Wilderness Trail illustrated by G. W. Gage (1913)
Children of Banishment (1914)
The Free Range
Harbor of Doubt (1915) Grosset & Dunlap
Alloy of Gold (1915)
Star of the North (1916) illustrated by D. C. Hutchison
The Godson of Jeanette Gontreau in War Stories

References

External links

Year of birth missing (living people)
Living people